Michael Rubin II (born September 24, 1963) is an American music producer, composer, voice actor and lyricist best known for his work in children’s television. Rubin has created musical pieces for shows including Bubble Guppies, Blue's Clues, Mickey Mouse Clubhouse, and Jack's Big Music Show, among others. On Blue's Clues, Rubin was also the voice of Mailbox. His songs have been performed by artists including Ray Charles, Patti LaBelle, Macy Gray, Randy Travis, India.Arie, Nell Carter, Toni Braxton, Phoebe Snow, and The Persuasions.

Career 
Rubin began his professional career making music for advertising. He founded the music production company Murmur Music Inc. in 1993. Murmur created music and sound design for commercials and promotional pieces for American Express, AMC, AT&T, Bell South, Citibank, Coca-Cola, Fisher Price, The Food Network, General Motors, Kraft, Maxwell House, Merck, Motorola, Nabisco, Paramount Pictures, Rockport, Samsung, UPS, VH1, Viacom, Volvo and others.

In 1995, Rubin (with writing partner Nick Balaban) created the music and sound design for the pilot episode of Blue's Clues. Rubin and Murmur created the soundtrack for all six seasons of the show as well as music for the traveling theatrical production Blue’s Clues Live, a feature-length direct-to-video movie Blue’s Big Musical Movie, the spin-off Blue’s Room, and other media. Rubin also provided the voice of the character Mailbox.

In 2007, Murmur Music partnered with Dubway Studios to form Rhumba Recorders, an audio production company for children's media. Shortly after this partnership, Rubin began writing and producing the songs and score for all seasons of the series Bubble Guppies.

Rubin, sometimes under the stage name Seth O'Hickory, has sung and voiced several characters in shows featuring his music. He sang lead vocals as a crab henchman in his song "She's So Mean," featured in the Bubble Guppies episode "Bubble Puppy's Fin-Tastic Fairy Tale." He is the voice of the sun in "The Planet Song," originally created for Blue's Clues and then featured in a NASA exhibit at the Kennedy Space Center in Cape Canaveral.

Filmography

Television

Film

Theatrical

Awards and nominations 
 2016 Daytime Emmy Award nomination for Outstanding Original Song for “Little Froggie,” from the Bubble Guppies episode "The Running of the Bullfrogs"
 2014 Daytime Emmy Award winner for Outstanding Music Direction and Composition for the Bubble Guppies (with collaborator John Angier)   
 2012 Annie Award nomination for Outstanding Achievement: Music in an Animated Television/Broadcast Production for the Bubble Guppies episode "Bubble Puppy's Fin-tastic Fairy Tale" 
 2008 Daytime Emmy Award nomination for Outstanding Original Song - Children's & Animated for "Duck 4" on Jack’s Big Music Show 
 2004 Daytime Emmy Award nomination for Outstanding Music Direction and Composition for (better yet) Blue's Clues

Personal life 
According to his Facebook, Rubin is married to Tamara (née Hanneman) and has three sons: Caleb, Tobias and Moses.

References

External links 
 
 Official website of Rhumba Recorders

20th-century American composers
21st-century American composers
American male voice actors
Canadian male voice actors
Living people
1963 births
Emmy Award winners